The Chairman is the third studio album by Nigerian hip hop recording artist M.I. It was released on October 30, 2014, by Chocolate City and Loopy Music. The album features collaborations with producers and guest artists such as 2face Idibia, Wizkid, Seyi Shay, Ice Prince, Olamide, Phyno, Reminisce, Oritse Femi, Patoranking, Reinhard, Runtown, Sarkodie, Nosa, Beenie Man, Koker, Moti Cakes, Wilson Alao, Sound Sultan, Emmy Ace, Sammy Gyang, Chigul, Milli, Frank Edwards, Nanya, G-Plus, Morell, Loose Kaynon, Pheelz, Debbie, DJ Lambo, Sarz, Stormrex, L-37, VSTOL and I.J. The album's production began in 2012 and continued through the third quarter of 2014. M.I worked with several collaborators while enlisting new producers. Much of The Chairman tells the story of the rapper's journey into limelight. According to M.I's team, the album sold 30,000 copies in pre-order sales. The Chairman was supported by three singles: "Bad Belle", "Monkey" and "Bullion Van".

Background
M.I spent two years recording the album. He describes the album as a collaborative album due to the number of music personnel who contributed to it.  The Chairman was initially slated for release in June 2013, but was postponed due to the rapper partaking in other business ventures. In an interview with Sunrise Daily in 2014, M.I said Jesse Jagz's departure from Chocolate City also delayed the album. In another interview with Leadership newspaper, M.I said he was inspired to name the album The Chairman after hearing people address him as such. The album comprises 17 tracks and every track, excluding "The Middle", has an opposite. On October 22, 2014, the album was made available for pre order. Seven days later, its official cover art and track list were released. M.I held a listening party for the album at Industry Nite on the same day. He performed alongside Jesse Jagz and dedicated the record "Brother" to him.

Composition
The Chairman encompasses several layers of M.I's autobiography. On the album's opener "The Beginning/Nobody", M.I plays the role of a crazy teacher with his voice. In the Chigul-assisted track "Monkey", he raps with a gospel flow over a highlife instrumental. In "Human Being", he reminds listeners that celebrity is not all its hyped up to be. In "Rich", M.I narrates his grass to grace story. In "Brother", he enlists Nosa to help him depict the cracks at Chocolate City. "Shekpe" is a song that celebrates street life and low-cost highs. In "Enemies", M.I and Patoranking tell listeners that the world of celebrity is a land filled with haters. "Yours" is an ode to his core fans who supported him from day one. In "The End/The Chairman", M.I tells listeners that the real chairman is God.

Promotional singles
The Chairman was supported by two promotional singles. The first promotional single "Chairman" was released on March 19, 2013; it was initially announced as the album's lead single. The song was produced by E.Kelly, Chopstix and M.I. It was launched via a Google Plus hangout, which was streamed live on Google Plus and YouTube. On May 13, 2013, the music video for "Chairman" was uploaded to YouTube; it was shot and directed in Los Angeles. According to Saturday Beats, M.I spent ₦10 million on the video shoot.

The second promotional single, titled "King James", was released on August 21, 2014. M.I describes the song as a non-profit project designed to create awareness and inspire social change. "King James" received generally mixed reviews from music critics.

Singles
"Bad Belle" was released as the album's lead single. Its music video was shot and directed in Nigeria by MEX; it features cameo appearances from Basketmouth, Mode 9, Sound Sultan, Yung6ix and Show Dem Camp, among others. The album's second single "Monkey" was released on March 26, 2015. The accompanying music video for "Monkey" was self-directed by M.I. "Bullion Van" was released as the album's third single. Its official music video was shot and directed by Mex. Kemi Adetiba shot an unreleased music video for the song at Koga Studios.

Critical reception

The Chairman received generally positive reviews from music critics. Toni Kan of Thisday newspaper called the album a "chockfull of hits" and characterized it as an "autobiography and memoir, manual and manifesto, pure fiction and drama, as well as poetry on an epic scale." Oscar Okeke of Lobatan gave the album an A rating, noting it "sounds like the result of an extended period of anxiety, overweighing thoughts, pressure, and other deep seated emotions that can only manifest through music." Ayomide Tayo of Pulse Nigeria awarded the album 4 stars out of 5, calling it "an inspiring, entertaining and a brilliant body of work from a master who has regained his magical touch."

Dayo Showemimo of Nigerian Entertainment Today granted  the album 4 stars out of 5, describing it as "legendary" and commending its production and technical detail. The Breaking Times gave the album 7 stars, concluding, "On  The Chairman, M.I. shows he hasn't lost much (in terms of song crafting and ear for beats), and therefore, has nothing to prove to naysayers". Reviewing for NotJustOk, Tola Sarumi rated the record 6.5 stars out of 10, concluding it has something for everyone. Wilfred Okiche from YNaija believes the album's defining experience came from its subtle songs. Henry Igwe, another YNaija writer, said the lyrics and production on "Human Being" are nonpareil, when compared to "Shekpe" or "Bullion Van".

In a less enthusiastic review, Jim Donnett of TooXclusive gave the album 2.5 stars out of 5, criticizing M.I's solo abilities and decision to feature 26 artists.

Accolades
The Chairman won Best Rap Album and was nominated for Album of the Year at The Headies 2015.

Track listing

Notes
  signifies a co-producer
  signifies an additional producer
 "Monkey" and "Bad Belle" contain additional vocals by Milli
 The skit performed on "Enemies" was done by Erica
 "Bullion Van" contains additional vocals by L37 and T-Soul
 "Millionaira Champagne" contains additional vocals by Reinhard
 "The End/The Chairman" contains additional vocals by Jade Abaga

Personnel
Credits adapted from M.I's website.

Jude Abaga – primary artist, executive producer, production, writing, mixing
Yahaya  Maikori – executive producer
Audu Maikori – executive producer
Paul Okeugo – executive producer
Innocent Idibia – performer 
Ayodeji Balogun – performer 
Deborah Joshua – performer  
Panshak Zamani – performer  
Olamide Adedeji – performer  
Azubuike Nelson – performer  
Remilekun Safaru – performer 
Oritsefemi Ekele – performer 
Patrick Okorie – performer 
Douglas Jack-Agu – performer 
Michael Addo – performer 
Nosa Omoregie – performer  
Anthony Davis – performer  
Sound Sultan – performer 
Koker – performer  
Moti Cakes – performer   
Morell – performer 
Loose Kaynon – performer 
Debbie – performer 
Stormrex – performer 
Ugo – performer 
Milli – additional vocals, performer 
Frank Edwards – performer, production
I.J – performer
Nanya – performer 
Chioma Omeruah – performer
Emmy Ace – performer
Jumar – performer
DJ Lambo – performer 
Jade Abaga – additional vocals
T-Soul – additional vocals
Reinhard – production, additional production, additional vocals 
Sarz – production
Pheelz – production
Sammy Gyang – production, additional production
L-37 – production, additional production, additional vocals, mixing
VSTOL – production
G-Plus – production,  mixing
Wilson Alao – mixing
Erica – skit performer 
August Udoh – photography
Blackchild – album design 
Tunde Ahmed – album design

Release history

References

2014 albums
M.I albums
Albums produced by Sammy Gyang
Albums produced by Pheelz
Albums produced by Sarz
Albums produced by M.I
Chocolate City (music label) albums
Albums produced by G-Plus
Albums produced by Reinhard
Albums produced by L-37